"Ride" (originally called "Ride or Die") is the second single from Ace Hood's debut album Gutta. It features Trey Songz, and is produced by The Inkredibles. T-Pain wrote the chorus.  The video was shot on August 1, 2008.

The song was originally titled "Ride or Die", until Def Jam renamed it "Ride" because it was more radio-friendly.

Music video
DJ Khaled, Johnny Dang, Rick Ross, and Torch & Gunplay from Triple C's make a cameo appearance. This is the first video in which Trey Songz shows his new look. 

The music video features Ace Hood having a good time with his girlfriend until she gets arrested for covering for him.

The song's music video also debuted at #9 on BET's 106 & Park.

Remix
The official remix has 2 versions.

Both versions features Rick Ross & Juelz Santana. But the first version, the original leaked version, features T-Pain on the chorus. And the second version, which is the video & album version, features Trey Songz on the chorus, replacing T-Pain, who was not in the video.

It has similar instrumentals to the original, but not quite the same. This is because DJ Khaled co-produced the remix and the original beat was replaced by DJ Khaled's beat.

The remix video was released with the video for "Get Em Up" on October 28, 2008. It features cameos from DJ Khaled, Akon, Twista, Jim Jones, Busta Rhymes, Jadakiss, DJ Drama, Brisco, Ray J, Shawty Lo and Soulja Boy Tell 'Em, Triple C's, among many others.

Charts

References

2008 singles
2008 songs
Ace Hood songs
Trey Songz songs
Song recordings produced by T-Pain
Songs written by Ace Hood
Songs written by T-Pain
Songs written by Trey Songz
Def Jam Recordings singles
Music videos directed by Dale Resteghini